Robert Darbinyan (born 4 October 1995) is a Russian-born, Armenian footballer who plays for FC Ararat Yerevan.

Career
On 14 January 2019, Darbinyan left Ararat-Armenia by mutual consent. He joined Banants on 16 January 2019.

Career statistics

Club

Notes

International

References

1995 births
Living people
Armenian footballers
Armenia international footballers
Armenia youth international footballers
Association football defenders
FC Shirak players
FC Ararat-Armenia players
FC Urartu players
Armenian Premier League players
Sportspeople from Tolyatti
Russian footballers
Russian sportspeople of Armenian descent
Citizens of Armenia through descent